Tagundaing or Ta Khun Taing (also spelled Tagondaing) is a large village in the Kayin State of south-eastern Myanmar, located near the west bank of the Winyaw River and the west of the Kyain Seikgyi Township, Kawkareik District. The population as of the 2014 census was 4,994. Most of the residents are of the Karen (Kayin) ethnic group.

The people in this village speak Kayin and Burma languages.

Nearby towns and villages include Kale (3.4 nm)north, Htimahto (6.4 nm)south-east, Phayanasu (7.1 nm)north, Kawankathaung (7.1 nm)east, Hlagazaing (7.5 nm)north, Myohaung (7.9 nm)north, Phathalē (8.7 nm)east and Akalaw (11.0 nm)east.

Etymology
In the Kayin, the word Somohto means monumental column or flagstaff. Thus, the village name of "'Tagundaing'" was derived from the local Kayin.

History
The name of the village gets its name from a monumental column or flagstaff located in the village centre.

During World War II, the villagers worked on the construction of the Burma-Siam railroad with their cart as forced labourers.

Transport

It is connected by road to Kyainseikgyi-Mudon and via Mudon to Mawlamyine.

The second main road is Tagondaing-Taungdi-Kyongawon-Phabya Road, it is connected Thanbyuzayat-Payathonzu Road(or Burmese-Siam Railroad), via Tanyin village.

Five miles by road to the west of village lie Abit village west of the Tenasserim Range, which road is connected to National Highway 8. Two miles is compacted.

Ta Khun Taing - Kawan Ka Thaung Road is about two miles long, cross the Winyaw River.

Economy
It is a primary agricultural village, with extensive fields around it.

The village's economy is mainly based on rice, rubber and trade.

Education
Tagundaing has one public high school, one public post-primary school and four public primary schools.

 Basic Education High School Tagondaing 
Post-Primary School (It is a post-primary school that is not a full middle school), formerly "No. 4 Basic Education Primary School"
No. 1 Basic Education Primary School 
No. 2 Basic Education Primary School 
No. 3 Basic Education Primary School 
Basic Education Primary School (Tagundaing New Quarter)

Healthcare
 Kale-Tagundaing Station Hospital serves the people of Kale, Tagondaing and its surrounding areas.

Climate

 Tagundaing has a tropical monsoon climate (Köppen climate classification Am). Temperatures are hot throughout the year, although maximum temperatures in the monsoon months are depressed by heavy cloud and rain. There is a winter dry season (November–April) and a summer wet season (May–October). Torrential rain falls from June to September, with over  falling in August alone.

Geography

 Tagundaing or Tagondaing is located on the eastern side of the Tenasserim Range near the confluence of two tributaries of the Ataran River.

Places of interest
Mahniyadanar Sandawshin Pagoda

White Padma lotus and many other families harvest plants such as the grass, can be found in this area.

Gallery

See also
 Kayin State

Notes

Tageo.com

Tagundaing Geonames

Tagondaing Mapcarta.com

Kayin State of asterism.info

References

External links

 "Tagundaing Map — Satellite Images of Tagundaing" Maplandia World Gazetteer 

 Tagondaing, Karen State, Myanmar WikiMapia

 "Burma 1:250,000 topographic map, Series U542, NE 47-14, Moulmein" U.S. Army May Service, December 1959

 "Tagundaing, Burma", Falling Rain Genomics, Inc.

 Tagundaing Weather in mirbig.net

 Tagundaing (Burma) 1994 - 2017, Photius Coutsoukis and Information Technology Associates

 Tagundaing Weather Forecast weather

Populated places in Kayin State